1. divisjon is the name of the second highest handball league for both genders in Norway. The two best placed teams win promotion to REMA 1000-ligaen for men and REMA 1000-ligaen for women, while the bottom finishers get relegated to the Norwegian 2. divisjon. The division consists of 14 teams that meet each opponent once away and once at home.

Volda are the defending champions for women, and Sandnes are the defending champions for men, and they both play in REMA 1000-ligaen for women and REMA 1000-ligaen for men in the current season.

Women 2022-23

Promotion to the League
The two best placed teams of the league ensures direct promotion to the premier handball league for Norwegian handball clubs. The third best placed team play a best of three qualification matches against the team who ended as No. 12 in REMA 1000-ligaen for men and REMA 1000-ligaen for women. The winner of these matches will play the next season in the premier league and the loser will play in 1. divisjon.

Relegation
Teams who end the season as #'s 13 and 14 will be directly relegated to 2. divisjon.

References

See also
 Handball
 REMA 1000-ligaen (women's handball)
 REMA 1000-ligaen (men's handball)

Women's handball in Norway
Women's handball leagues
Professional sports leagues in Norway
Women's sports leagues in Norway